Sid Krofft (born July 30, 1929) and Marty Krofft (born April 9, 1937) are a Canadian sibling team of television creators and puppeteers. Through their production company, Sid & Marty Krofft Pictures, they have made numerous children's television and variety show programs in the U.S., particularly in the 1970s, including H.R. Pufnstuf, Land of the Lost and Sigmund and the Sea Monsters. Their fantasy programs often feature large-headed puppets, high-concept plots, and extensive use of low-budget special effects.

Early years 
The Krofft brothers, Sid and Marty, were born in Montreal, Quebec, Canada on July 30, 1929, and April 9, 1937. They are of Greek and Hungarian descent, with their original surname being Yolas. For years, they claimed to have been the fifth generation of puppeteers in their family but revealed in 2008 that this story was invented by a publicist in the 1940s. Their father Peter was a clock salesman who moved from Canada to Providence, Rhode Island, and then to New York City. Sid Krofft became a noted puppeteer who worked in vaudeville and was a featured player with the Ringling Bros. and Barnum & Bailey Circus. In the 1940s, Sid created a one-man puppet show, "The Unusual Artistry of Sid Krofft", and performed it throughout the world. His father joined him on tour in Paris while Marty stayed in New York, where he started using his older brother's puppets to earn money by staging performances. By the 1950s, the Krofft brothers were working together, and in 1957, they developed Les Poupées de Paris, a puppet show with more mature themes. One of their early exposures to a television audience was the premier episode of The Dean Martin Show in 1965.

Television productions 
After designing the characters and sets for Hanna-Barbera's The Banana Splits (NBC, 1968–1970), the Krofft's' producing career began in 1969 with the landmark children's television series H.R. Pufnstuf. The series introduced the team's trademark style of large-scale, colorful design, puppetry, and special effects. Featuring a boy who has been lured into an alternate fantasy world and can never escape, the team also established a storytelling formula to which they would return often. Some people suggested that the Krofft brothers were influenced by marijuana and LSD, although they have always denied these claims. In a 2005 interview with USA Today, Marty Krofft said, "No drugs involved. You can't do drugs when you're making shows. Maybe after, but not during. We're bizarre, that's all." Referring to the alleged LSD use, Marty said in another interview, "That was our look, those were the colors, everything we did had vivid colors, but there was no acid involved. That scared me. I'm no goody two-shoes, but you can't create this stuff stoned."

The Kroffts also favored quirky superhero stories, often with children involved as the heroes or part of a hero team. Particularly visionary and popular Krofft productions have included The Bugaloos (1970), Lidsville (1971), Sigmund and the Sea Monsters (1973-1975), Land of the Lost (1974-1976), The Lost Saucer (1975), Electra Woman and Dyna Girl (1976), and Wonderbug (1976-1978).

The World of Sid and Marty Krofft 

In 1976, a developer asked the Kroffts to develop an indoor amusement park for the new Omni International complex downtown Atlanta. The park, The World of Sid and Marty Krofft, closed after six months due to poor attendance. The Omni International building that contained it was renamed the CNN Center when the site was converted to the present CNN headquarters.

Achievements 
The Kroffts' children's programs have developed a wide and enduring following, largely among adults who watched the shows as children. They were also responsible for a large number of prime-time music and variety programs. These shows also tended to employ a reliable formula, in this case featuring a celebrity host or team of hosts, weekly celebrity guest performers, flashy and colorful sets, and frequent interludes of scripted banter and gag-driven, "corny," good-natured sketch comedy.

The Kroffts are often acknowledged for the ambitious vision and creativity of their projects. In addition to their colorful and hyper-kinetic programs, they often created children's shows with complex stories, unusual protagonists, and uniquely modern sensibilities, or with darker or more action-themed tones than most children's shows. Their "camp" popularity stems largely from their shows' low-budget production values, the often surrealistic feel of many of the programs, and the uniquely "70s" style of music and design.

Later years 
The Kroffts have occasionally departed from their formula while making new programs further on, such as on Pryor's Place (1984) and the political puppet satire show D.C. Follies (1987). They have attempted to update some of their classic series for a younger generation, including new versions of Land of the Lost, Electra Woman and Dyna Girl, H.R. Pufnstuf and Sigmund and the Sea Monsters. A new original series, Mutt & Stuff, aired on Nickelodeon from 2015 to 2017.

In 2018, the Kroffts received the Lifetime Achievement Award at the Daytime Emmys.

In 2020, the Kroffts were honored with a star on the Hollywood Walk of Fame for their contributions to television.

In May 2022, the Kroffts participated in the first Krofft Kon, a convention held in Orinda, California, where they were joined by some of the actors from their television series.

Awards

Works

TV series
 Sigmund and the Sea Monsters (2016)
Mutt & Stuff (2015)
Land of the Lost (1991)
D.C. Follies (1987)
Pryor's Place (1984)
Barbara Mandrell and the Mandrell Sisters (1980)
Pink Lady and Jeff (1980)
The Krofft Superstar Hour (1978; a.k.a. The Bay City Rollers Show)
Horror Hotel
The Lost Island
The Brady Bunch Hour (1977)
The Krofft Supershow (1976)
Dr. Shrinker (1976)
Electra Woman and Dyna Girl (1976)
Kaptain Kool and the Kongs (1976)
Wonderbug (1976)
Bigfoot and Wildboy (1977)
Magic Mongo (1977)
Donny & Marie (1976; a.k.a. The Osmond Family Show)
The Lost Saucer (1975)
Far Out Space Nuts (1975)
Land of the Lost (1974)
Sigmund and the Sea Monsters (1973)
Lidsville (1971)
The Bugaloos (1970)
H.R. Pufnstuf (1969)
The Banana Splits (1968)

TV specials/pilots
Electra Woman and Dyna Girl (2001, unaired pilot)
Krofft Late Night (1991)
Sid & Marty Krofft's Red Eye Express (1988)
The Patti LaBelle Show (1985)
Rock 'n' Wrestling Saturday Spectacular (1985)
The Cracker Brothers (1985)
Saturday's the Place (1984)
Oral Roberts Celebration (1981)
The CBS Saturday Morning Preview Special (1983)
Anson & Lorrie (1981)
Bobby Vinton's Rock 'n' Rollers (1978)
The Krofft Komedy Hour (1978)
The Bay City Rollers Meet the Saturday Superstars (1978)
Kaptain Kool and the Kongs Present ABC All-Star Saturday (1977)
The Brady Bunch Variety Hour (1976)
The Paul Lynde Halloween Special (1976) - Did not produce, but includes Witchiepoo and other Krofft regulars
Jimmy Osmond Presents ABC's Saturday Sneak Peek (1976)
Really Raquel (1974)
Prevue Revue (1974)
The World of Sid & Marty Krofft at the Hollywood Bowl (1973)
Fol-de-Rol (1972)

Direct-to-video
Wishing Well Willy (1995)
Toby Terrier and His Video Pals (1993-1994) - Created to interact with an electronic toy manufactured by Tiger Electronics

Films
Land of the Lost (2009)
Harry Tracy, Desperado (1982)
Side Show (1981)
Middle Age Crazy (1980)
Pufnstuf (1970)

Live shows
"Blast" (1991)
Comedy Kings (1988)
A Broadway Baby (1984)
Fol-de-Rol (1968)
Kaleidescope (1968)
Circus (1966)
Funny World (1966)
Les Poupées de Paris (1961)
Howdy, Mr. Ice of 1950 (1949)

Web series
Sigmund and the Sea Monsters (2017)
 Electra Woman and Dyna Girl (2016)

References

External links

The World of Sid and Marty Krofft

 
Canadian television producers
People from Montreal
Sibling duos
Living people
Sibling filmmakers
1929 births
1937 births
Hanna-Barbera people